Whitney Wolanin (born June 29, 1990) is an American singer and songwriter. Born in Albany, New York, and raised in southwest Florida, she entered the music industry through recording a number of sessions with Funk Brothers bassist Bob Babbitt in 2003. Her subsequent singles "Honesty" (2012), "Wrong Guy" (2013), and "Forever" (2014) garnered AC radio airplay. She currently co-owns and operates the independent record label TopNotch.

Early life and education
Whitney Wolanin was born on June 29, 1990, in Albany, New York. Her mother, Illona Wolanin, is a retired teacher and her father, Vincent Wolanin, is a businessman from Philadelphia. Shortly after her birth, the family moved to Lee County, Florida, where she attended Fort Myers High School.

In 2011, Wolanin received a B.S. from Vanderbilt University. She majored in Human and Organizational development and studied voice at the Blair school of music. During her time at Vanderbilt, Wolanin was a member of the improv comedy group Tongue-N-Cheek, as well as Vanderbilt Off-Broadway, appearing in their production of Nine.
Wolanin also holds a Diplôme de Cuisine from Le Cordon Bleu, London.

Career
In 2004, Wolanin began recording a collaboration with Bob Babbitt titled Funkology XIII. The album was released July 12, 2005, and consisted of twelve Motown covers and one original. Its two singles, "Good" and "It Takes Two", the latter featuring Jimi Jamison of Survivor, made it into Friday Morning Quarterback's adult contemporary chart at No. 7 and No. 9 respectively. A holiday counterpart to the album, Christmasology, was released the following year. The lead single, "Frosty the Snowman", was played across more than eight hundred stations and peaked at No. 11 on radio charts.

Wolanin's follow-up single, "Loud and Clear" (2007), received airplay on dance and club radio and was also featured in an episode of The Hills. She subsequently released two EPs, Girl in 2009 and Whitney Wolanin 1 in 2011. An acoustic version of Girl's "So Close" was included on Majic Miracle Music Vol. 3, a benefit album for the James Whitcomb Riley Hospital for Children.

“Honesty" became Wolanin's first original single to chart at AC radio. From January 9, 2012, it climbed the charts for thirty-six weeks, peaking at No. 21 on Mediabase and No. 23 on Billboard. Later that year, Wolanin released her third EP, Let's Be Honest Part 1, as well as recording a version of "Frosty the Snowman" that would go on to reach No. 13 on Billboard's AC chart.

On February 11, 2013, Wolanin released "Wrong Guy (I Did It This Time)". The single reached No. 16 and No. 17 on the AC charts at Mediabase and Billboard respectively. Her Christmas single, "Run, Run Rudolph", charted at No. 2 on both the Mediabase holiday chart and Billboard's AC chart. The track premiered exclusively on Yahoo! Music. Its accompanying music video, directed by Carl Diebold, was a pastiche of "A Christmas Story". The video was shot on location in Cleveland, Ohio, and featured a number of props from the film. In 2020, "Run, Run Rudolph" was featured in the Hallmark film "Christmas By Starlight".

Wolanin released a further two singles in 2014. "Forever" went to No. 23 on the AC charts at both Mediabase and Billboard, while "Silver Bells" reached No. 3 at Billboard, bringing Wolanin's consecutive chart appearances up to six.

In December 2016, Wolanin released "Never Said No", a single that aims to dispel misconceptions surrounding sexual assault. The song's subject is partially drawn from Wolanin's experience of being accosted by two men in a London park.

Discography
Funkology XIII (2005, TopNotch)
"Christmas (The Warmest Time of the Year)" single (2005, TopNotch)
Christmasology (2006, TopNotch)
"Loud and Clear" single (2007, TopNotch)
Girl EP (2009, TopNotch)
1 EP (2011, TopNotch)
Let's Be Honest, Pt. 1 EP (2012, TopNotch)
"Wrong Guy (I Did It This Time)" single (2013, TopNotch)
"Run, Run Rudolph" Mini Album (2013, TopNotch)
"Forever" single (2014, TopNotch)
"Never Said No" Single (2016, TopNotch)
Aside Album (2022, TopNotch)

References

External links
Official website

Living people
1990 births
American women pop singers
American pop rock singers
21st-century American women singers
21st-century American singers